Ralf Schulenberg (born 15 August 1949) is a retired East German footballer.

Club career 
The striker scored 25 goals in the East German top-flight.  Schulenberg was voted the 1975 BFC Footballer of the Year at the 10th edition of the club's traditional ball in the Dynamo-Sporthalle at the beginning of January 1976.

International career 
In 1972 the BFC Dynamo player was part of the East Germany national team. One of his three full international matches in the year took place as part of the 1972 Olympic football tournament where Schulenberg won the bronze medal with the East German Olympic team.

References

External links
 
 
 Player Profile at DFB.de 
 
 

1945 births
Living people
German footballers
East German footballers
Footballers at the 1972 Summer Olympics
Olympic footballers of East Germany
Olympic bronze medalists for East Germany
East Germany international footballers
FC Rot-Weiß Erfurt players
Berliner FC Dynamo players
Olympic medalists in football
DDR-Oberliga players
Medalists at the 1972 Summer Olympics
Sportspeople from Erfurt
Association football forwards
Footballers from Thuringia